A Suitcase for a Corpse is a 1970 Italian-Spanish giallo film directed by Alfonso Brescia. 

The film's Italian title, Il tuo dolce corpo da uccidere, translates as Your Sweet Body to Kill.

Plot
After learning that she is cheating on him, a man who constantly fantasizes about murdering his beautiful young wife decides to do it for real. His plot involves disposing of her body in a suitcase.

Cast 
 George Ardisson: Clive Ardington 
 Françoise Prévost: Diana Ardington 
 Eduardo Fajardo: Franz Adler 
 Orchidea De Santis: Elena Sanders 
 Félix Dafauce

References

External links

A Suitcase for a Corpse at Variety Distribution

1970 films
1970s crime thriller films
Giallo films
1970s Italian-language films
Films directed by Alfonso Brescia
Films scored by Carlo Savina
1970s Italian films